Firouz Michael Naderi (: Fīrouz Nāderi; born 25 March 1946) is an Iranian American scientist who spent 36 years in various technical and executive positions at NASA's Jet Propulsion Laboratory (JPL) where he contributed to some of America's most iconic robotic space missions.

He retired from NASA in 2016 and currently is a management consultant, an advisor to early-stage high-tech startups, and a public speaker. He is based in Pacific Palisades neighborhood of Los Angeles, California.

Early life and education

His elementary education was in Shiraz, Iran, where he was born on 25 March 1946. He attended high school in Tehran, Iran at an Italian boarding school (Don Bosco Boarding School) and left Iran in 1964 for the United States to pursue his college education. He received his undergraduate degree in electrical engineer at Iowa State University (ISU) in 1969 before moving to California. After working as an engineer in Santa Barbara for two years, he enrolled at University of Southern California (USC) in Los Angeles where he received his M.S. in 1972 and his Ph.D. in 1976 both in electrical engineering.

After completing his education, he went back to Iran for three years, working at the Iranian Remote Sensing Agency but returned to America in July 1979 a few months after Iran's revolution. He has not returned to Iran since. He is fluent in English in addition to his native Persian language.

Career at NASA

He started at NASA's JPL in September 1979 as a communications system engineer, and in a course of a three-decade career rose through the ranks to senior executive positions. His career at JPL has spanned system engineering, technology development, program and project management for satellite communications systems, Earth remote sensing observatories, astrophysical observatories, and planetary systems.

His early work at JPL was on system design of large satellite-based systems for nationwide cellular phone coverage. He went to NASA Headquarters for two years in the mid-1980s to serve as the program manager for the Advanced Communications Technology Satellite (ACTS), the frontrunner of today's multi-beam, space-switching commercial satellites. Upon his return to JPL, he became the project manager for the NASA Scatterometer (NSCAT) project aimed at space-based radar measurement of winds over the global oceans with application to weather forecasting. He was awarded NASA's Outstanding Leadership Medal for his management of this project. Following NSCAT, in the mid-1990s he managed the Origins Program, NASA's ambitious, technology-rich plan, to search for Earth-like planets in other planetary systems.

Management of the Mars Program

He was named NASA's Program Manager for Mars exploration in April 2000 after the agency had suffered two consecutive, very public failures in the previous year. In the summer of 2000, he helped re-plan the Program as a chain of scientifically, technologically and operationally interrelated missions with a spacecraft launched to Mars every two years. He led the Program for the next five years, a span of time that included the successful landing of the Mars Exploration Rovers, Spirit and Opportunity. All told, from 2000 to 2012 there has been an unprecedented 6 consecutive successful American missions to Mars (4 landers and 2 orbiters) based on the roadmap devised in the summer of 2000. For management of the Mars Program, in 2005 he was awarded NASA's highest award, the NASA Distinguished Service Medal.

JPL's Associate Director

After the Mars Program, he was appointed JPL's first associate director for Project Formulation and Strategy, serving as the Laboratory's senior official providing oversight of JPL new business acquisition and senior strategic planning officer. He created JPL's Innovation Foundry, an internal startup ecosystem akin to accelerator/incubator outfits in Silicon Valley. For six years, he managed an annual $100M internal investment fund for identifying and maturing nascent technologies, and mission concepts that showed the potential to grow into funded space projects.

Director for Solar System Exploration

During his last five years at JPL, he was Director of Solar System Exploration with responsibility for the Cassini spacecraft at Saturn, Dawn mission to Asteroids Vesta and Ceres, Juno mission to Jupiter, and formulation of the first-ever Mars helicopter, and a multibillion-dollar mission to Europa (a moon of Jupiter) in search of life outside of Earth.

Asteroid Naderi

After 36 years, he retired from NASA in February 2016. At a farewell party in his honor, it was announced that the International Astronomical Union had renamed Asteroid 1989 EL1 as Asteroid "5515 Naderi" for his contribution to space exploration. The asteroid was discovered by the late American astronomer, Eleanor F. Helin, at the Palomar Observatory in San Diego County, California, on March 5, 1989, and is about 10 kilometers (6 miles) in diameter. It rotates about itself every 5.2 hours and orbits the Sun every 4.4 years. "Fortunately, it is not an Earth-crosser," says Naderi.

Life after NASA 

In his post-NASA career, he serves as a management consultant, an advisor to early-stage high-tech startups (e.g., OpalAi), and a public speaker. He also serves as a coach and mentor to the next generation of leaders within the Iranian-American community.

Teaching and public speaking

He is frequently invited as a keynote and motivational speaker at conferences and workshops. He has given talks to student associations at many universities, including: Stanford University, University of California, Berkeley, University of Southern California, Duke University, University of Toronto, Virginia Tech, University of British Columbia, University of California, San Diego, Texas A&M International University, Texas A&M University at Qatar, the University of Houston, Western Michigan University, and Karlsruhe Institute of Technology—Germany

He has taught modules in executive education classes at Stanford University's on "Management of Large Complex Programs."

Philanthropy and community support

He is an active advocate for the Iranian-American diaspora formerly having served on the board of directors of Public Affairs Alliance of Iranian Americans (PAAIA). He has also served on the advisory boards of several philanthropic organizations, including currently on Arasteh-Amin Foundation, and in the past on Keep Children in School Foundation (KCIS, and International Society of Children with Cancer (ISCC), and is a former board member of Iranica Encyclopedia.

When asked that after living 50 years in America, does he feel more American or Persian, he said,

Political affiliation

He is a registered Democrat. His view on the political system in Iran is that the people living in Iran should decide what is the best system of government for them. But, he favors a democratically elected, secular government, observing full civil liberties and human rights with separation of "church" and state. He himself has no religious affiliation. However, in an interview in 2011, he called himself a "spiritual" person, believing in "something" beyond himself but not within the framework of any religion.

Representing Iran at the 89th Academy Awards
He and Anousheh Ansari represented Iranian filmmaker Asghar Farhadi at the 89th Academy Awards on for its winning in the Best Foreign Language Film category. Because of Farhadi's absence due to president Trump's 2017 immigration ban over seven Muslim countries including Iran; Farhadi selected Naderi and Ansari as his representatives at the Oscars, given that both of them are successful Iranian-Americans who immigrated to the US. On February 26, 2017, they accepted the Academy Award for Best Foreign Language Film for The Salesman on Farhadi's behalf. In the press briefing after the award when asked why he and Anousheh were chosen by the filmmaker to accept the award, he replied that it likely was because both Anousheh and he have a space perspective of Earth, "As you pull away from the Earth and look back at it all you see is a beautiful blue planet without any lines, borders or -- walls. Home to all of us."

Recognitions and awards
Fellow of the American Institute of Aeronautics and Astronautics (AIAA)
NASA, Outstanding Leadership Medal
1997 – Space Technology Hall of Fame Medal
2005 – Ellis Island Medal of Honor
2005 – NASA, Distinguished Service Medal. This is the highest award given at NASA, for his "distinguished contribution to space science and exploration."
2007 – The Engineers Council of Northridge, California, Theodore von Kármán Mission Excellence Award
2010 – American Astronautical Society (AAS) William Randolph Lovelace II Award
2015 – "Great Immigrants: The Pride of America" by Carnegie Corporation of New York
2016 – Asteroid 1989 EL1 renamed Asteroid "5515 Naderi"
2022 - inducted into Iowa State University's Department of Electrical and Computer Engineering Hall of Fame
2023 - Distinguished Alumni Signal and Image Processing Institute (SIPI) University of Southern California (USC)

References

External links

Firouz Naderi bio on the JPL website, from 2017
Firouz Naderi bio on U.S. Virtual Embassy Iran, from 2015

Iranian emigrants to the United States
Fellows of the American Institute of Aeronautics and Astronautics
Iranian engineers
NASA people
USC Viterbi School of Engineering alumni
Living people
1946 births
People from Shiraz
21st-century American engineers
Iowa State University alumni
20th-century Iranian engineers